Chris Elliott (6 October 1953 – 22 July 2017) was an Australian rules footballer who played with South Melbourne in the Victorian Football League (VFL).

Notes

External links 

Chris Elliott - Obituary

2017 deaths
1953 births
Australian rules footballers from Victoria (Australia)
Sydney Swans players